The Order of Merit of the Free State of Thuringia is the highest order which is bestowed by the Free State of Thuringia. The number of living holders of the order is limited to 300 persons.

Notable recipients
 Iris von Arnim
 Rolf-Dieter Arens
 Alan Bern
Andreas Birkmann
 Yehoshua Büchler
Tankred Dorst
Josef Duchac
 Helmut Fritsche
 Stéphane Hessel
 Ivan Ivanji
Sarah Kirsch
 Hans-Reinhard Koch
Hilmar Kopper
Reiner Kunze
 Werner Leich
 Peter Maser
Gunda Niemann-Stirnemann
 Peter Röhlinger
 Stephan Schambach
Lothar Späth
Bernhard Vogel
 Nike Wagner
Günter Weiler

References 

Thuringia
Thuringia
Culture of Thuringia